Sharafudheen, professionally credited as Sharaf U Dheen, is an Indian actor who appears in Malayalam films. He made his acting debut in 2013 with Neram. He got his breakthrough by portraying the role of Girirajan Kozhi in Premam (2015). Sharaf U Dheen's known for both his comedic and villain roles. He's best known for his roles in the films Paavada (2015), Happy Wedding  (2016), Pretham (2016), Georgettan's Pooram (2017), Njandukalude Nattil Oridavela (2017), Varathan (2018), Neeyum Njanum (2019), Children's Park (2019), Virus (2019), Anjaam Pathiraa (2020), Halal Love Story (2020), and Aarkkariyam (2021).

Early and personal life
Sharafudheen hails from Aluva in the district of Ernakulam, Kerala. After having  completed his studies, he marked his expertise in many industries. He later established a Travel Company at his hometown before foraying into Cinema. He is married to  Beema from Changanassery in 2015. The couple has 2 Daughters.

Career
He made his acting debut in Neram in 2013, directed by Alphonse Puthren. He also acted in Ohm Shanthi Oshaana (2014) directed by Jude Anthany Joseph. He received breakthrough with the Alphonse Putharen-directed romantic-comedy Premam in 2015. In the film he played the role of Girirajan Kozhi, a flirt. He acted along with Prithviraj Sukumaran in the film Pavada in 2016. He has also worked in Pretham, Carbon (2018) and Thobama (2018) which was produced by Alphonse Puthren. In 2019, he acted in his debut leading role in Neeyum Njanum. In 2020 he appeared in Anjaam Pathiraa, where he played a negative role.

Filmography

All films are in Malayalam language unless otherwise noted.

References

External links 
 

Male actors from Kochi
Indian male film actors
Living people
Male actors in Malayalam cinema
Male actors in Tamil cinema
21st-century Indian male actors
1984 births